Igor Zakharevich (July 14th 1963 – August 10th 2008) was a Russian chess Grandmaster. In October 2005 he tied for 1st–2nd with Roman Ovetchkin in the Chigorin Memorial.

References

1963 births
2008 deaths
Chess grandmasters
20th-century chess players